Persectania ewingii, the southern armyworm, is a moth of the family Noctuidae. It is found in the south and east of Australia and often migrates across the Bass Strait to Tasmania.

The wingspan is about 40 mm.

The larvae feed on Pisum sativum, Linum usitatissimum and Hordeum species and it is considered a pest on these species. It causes severe damage by chewing through the stems of the food plant, thus severing the seed heads.

References

Hadeninae
Moths of Australia
Moths described in 1839